Brugman is a Dutch toponymic surname meaning "bridgeman". It could refer to someone living near a bridge, or as an occupational name to a bridge keeper. In some cases it refers to someone originally from Bruges (Brugge) in West Flanders. Notable people with the surname include:

 Alyssa Brugman (born 1974), Australian author
 Gastón Brugman (born 1992), Uruguayan football midfielder
 Jaycob Brugman (born 1992), American baseball player
 John Brugman (c.1400–1473), Franciscan preacher in the Low Countries
 Mathias Brugman (1811–1868), Puerto Rican revolutionary leader
 Til Brugman (1888–1958), Dutch poet and linguist

See also 
 Brugmann
 Brugmans
 Bruggeman

References

Dutch-language surnames
Dutch toponymic surnames
Occupational surnames

de:Brugman
nl:Brugman